These are the Official Charts Company's UK Indie Chart number-one albums of 2011.

Singer Adele is by far and far away the most successful artist of 2011 on the chart, spending 46 weeks atop the chart, out of 52 weeks, with her two albums, 19 topped the first four weeks on the chart, and then 21 topped for another forty-two non-consecutive weeks, leading it as the best selling Indie album of the year, and making 21 as the longest-running album at the top spot on the chart since it has started.

Chart history

See also
List of UK Albums Chart number ones of the 2010s
List of UK Dance Albums Chart number ones of 2011
List of UK Album Downloads Chart number ones of the 2010s
List of UK Independent Singles Chart number ones of 2011
List of UK R&B Albums Chart number ones of 2011

References

External links
Independent Albums Chart at the Official Charts Company
UK Top 40 Indie Album Chart at BBC Radio 1

2011 in British music
United Kingdom Indie Albums
2011